Moho (aymara: Muju) is a town in Southern Peru, capital of the province Moho in the region Puno.

References

Populated places in the Puno Region